Dominik Janošek (born 13 June 1998) is a Czech footballer who plays as a defender for Pardubice.

Club career

FC Zbrojovka Brno
He made his professional debut for Zbrojovka Brno in the home match against Slovácko on 14 October 2017, which ended in a win 2:1.

References

External links
 
 Profile at FC Zbrojovka Brno official site
 Profile at FAČR
 

1998 births
Footballers from Brno
Living people
Czech footballers
Czech Republic youth international footballers
Czech Republic under-21 international footballers
Association football midfielders
Association football defenders
FC Zbrojovka Brno players
1. FC Slovácko players
FC Viktoria Plzeň players
FK Mladá Boleslav players
FC Fastav Zlín players
Czech First League players
FK Pardubice players